Flight Lieutenant Edmund Roger Tempest  (30 October 1894 – 17 December 1921) was a British First World War flying ace credited with 17 aerial victories.

Early life and family background
Edmund Tempest was born at the family estate of Ackworth Grange, in Ackworth, Yorkshire, the son of Wilfrid Francis Tempest, a member of the notable recusant Tempest family, and his second wife Florence Helen O'Rourke. (Wilfrid had a total of 15 children from two marriages). Tempest was educated at The Oratory School in Edgbaston. In 1912 he and his brother, Wulstan Joseph Tempest, moved to Perdue, Saskatchewan, to farm, but returned to England to enlist on the outbreak of the war.

World War I
Tempest was commissioned as a temporary second lieutenant on 30 November 1914, to serve in the King's Own Yorkshire Light Infantry. On 18 August 1915 he was granted Royal Aero Club Aviators' Certificate No. 1604 after soloing a Maurice Farman biplane at the Military School in Birmingham, and on 3 November he was appointed a flying officer in the Royal Flying Corps, transferred to the General List.

He served in No. 6, No. 15, and No. 29 Squadrons, receiving promotion to lieutenant on 1 April 1916. He was posted to No. 64 Squadron in July 1917, being appointed a flight commander with the acting rank of captain on the 30th.

Tempest gained his first aerial victory on 30 November 1917 flying an Airco DH.5 single-seat fighter, by driving down out of control an Albatros D.V. His squadron was re-equipped with the S.E.5a fighter in early 1918, and Tempest shot down five enemy aircraft in March. On 1 April 1918, the Royal Flying Corps was merged with the Royal Naval Air Service to form the Royal Air Force, and his unit became No. 64 Squadron RAF. Tempest destroyed two more aircraft that month, then two more in May, also being awarded the Military Cross on the 13th. He accounted for one enemy aircraft in June, and another in July, and finally five in August, before being posted back to England, where on 2 November he was awarded the Distinguished Flying Cross.

Of his brothers, Major Wilfred Norman Tempest, 2nd Battalion (attached 9th Battalion), King's Own Yorkshire Light Infantry, was killed in action on 26 September 1916, and is commemorated on the Thiepval Memorial, while Major Wulstan Joseph Tempest also served in the KOYLI and Royal Flying Corps, shooting down Zeppelin L.31 over Potters Bar on 1 October 1916 while serving in No. 39 (Home Defence) Squadron. He was subsequently awarded the Military Cross and the Distinguished Service Order.

List of aerial victories

Post-war career and death
Tempest remained in the RAF after the war, being granted a permanent commission with the rank of captain on 1 August 1919. He was serving as a flight lieutenant in No. 216 Squadron RAF, when on 17 December 1921 his Airco DH.10 Amiens crashed on takeoff at an aerodrome in West Baghdad. He died as a result of his injuries and is buried in North Gate War Cemetery, Baghdad.

Honours and awards
Military Cross
Temporary Captain Edmund Roger Tempest, General List and Royal Flying Corps.
"For conspicuous gallantry and devotion to duty. He attacked a formation of seven enemy machines, firing on one from a distance of a few feet and destroying it. On another occasion with his patrol he engaged thirteen enemy machines. Though both his guns were out of action, he continued fighting for fifteen minutes in order to enable the rest of his patrol to keep up the fight. Having driven off the enemy, he brought his patrol back safely. He showed splendid courage and initiative."
 
Distinguished Flying Cross
Captain Edmund Roger Tempest, MC.
"Since March last this officer has destroyed nine enemy machines. A daring and most capable officer, who never hesitates to engage the enemy. By brilliant leadership he achieves success with the minimum of loss.

References

1894 births
1921 deaths
Aviators killed in aviation accidents or incidents
People from Ackworth, West Yorkshire
People educated at The Oratory School
English Roman Catholics
King's Own Yorkshire Light Infantry officers
Royal Flying Corps officers
Royal Air Force officers
British World War I flying aces
Recipients of the Military Cross
Recipients of the Distinguished Flying Cross (United Kingdom)
Victims of aviation accidents or incidents in Iraq
Victims of aviation accidents or incidents in 1921
Edmund
Burials in Iraq
Royal Air Force personnel of World War I
British Army personnel of World War I
Military personnel from Yorkshire